The 2010 Manta Open – Trofeo Ricardo Delgado Aray was a professional tennis tournament played on outdoor hard courts. It was part of the 2010 ATP Challenger Tour. It took place in Manta, Ecuador between April 26 and May 2, 2010.

ATP entrants

Seeds

Rankings are as of April 19, 2010.

Other entrants
The following players received wildcards into the singles main draw:
  Carlton Fiorentino
  Diego Acosta
  Júlio César Campozano
  Emilio Gómez

The following players received entry from the qualifying draw:
  Mauricio Echazú
  Iván Endara
  Sebastian Rieschick
  Roman Valent

Champions

Singles

 Go Soeda def.  Ryler DeHeart, 7–6(5), 6–2

Doubles

 Ryler DeHeart /  Pierre-Ludovic Duclos def.  Martin Emmrich /  Andreas Siljeström, 6–4, 7–5

References
Official website
ITF Search 

Manta Open
Manta Open